Nancy Álvarez (born 10 October 1950) is a Dominican singer, television personality, and licensed clinical psychologist, sexologist, and family therapist. She is best known for hosting the talk show , where she helped counsel families and couples with their interpersonal problems.

She is currently the star host of Sin Rollos y Tapujos in Despierta América, the morning show for Univision, and Dra. Nancy, a digital show.

Biography
Her singing career began in the 1970s when she moved to Puerto Rico. Álvarez began her professional career as a performer at the age of 15 and soon became the lead singer with Michel Camilo's band, an international group which toured in the 1970s.

She graduated from the Autonomous University of Santo Domingo. By the 1980s, following her studies, she began a new career a television producer and host, specializing in personal and family relationships and sex therapy. Her most recent program,  was broadcast by Univision and produced by Venevisión International.

Álvarez is also a writer, frequently contributing to several newspapers in Santo Domingo and Colombia. She has also served as vice-president of the Center of Clinical and Industrial Psychology, is president of Psychology and Sexuality Counselors, Inc., and has devoted time to private counseling.

In 2005, she decided to return to the musical stage, without leaving her career as a sexologist, and thus created a unique performance, educating her audience in matters of sex and, at the same time, performing related songs. Her partner in the show is the Puerto Rican singer and composer Lou Briel, performing as singer and musical director.

In 2008, she participated as one of the guest speakers in the motivational conference, a project created by Alberto Sardinas. In 2009, she underwent multiple plastic surgery procedures.

References

External links

1950 births
Living people
People from Santo Domingo
Dominican Republic television presenters
Dominican Republic women television presenters
Dominican Republic television talk show hosts
Dominican Republic psychologists
Dominican Republic women psychologists
Universidad Autónoma de Santo Domingo alumni
White Dominicans